The Bulgarian Christian Coalition (Българска християнска коалиция, Balgarska Hristiyanska Koalitsiya) is a Christian democratic political party in Bulgaria. The party was founded by Krasimir Momchev (who had until then worked with the Union of Democratic Forces), Pastor Dian Karaivanov, television maker Blagovest Belev and others.

In the 1997 parliamentary elections, the Bulgarian Christian Coalition ended as the eighth party in size with 0.66% of the votes. The party has several members of local councils.

The Bulgarian Christian Coalition is a member of the European Christian Political Movement (ECPM).

External links
Official website of the Bulgarian Christian Coalition (in Bulgarian)
Website of the European Christian Political Movement, of which the Bulgarian Christian Coalition is a member
History of the Bulgarian Christian Coalition (in Bulgarian)
Politics of Bulgaria
Conservative parties in Bulgaria
Christian democratic parties in Europe